Memory Muscle is the debut solo album by the Bluetones vocalist Mark Morriss, released on May 26, 2008 on Fullfill Records.

Track listing
All tracks written by Mark Morriss, except track 5 (Norman Blake) & track 11 (Lee Hazlewood).

 "How Maggie Got Her Bounce Back"
 "I'm Sick"
 "So It Goes"
 "Buckle Up, Baby Doll"
 "Alcoholiday"
 "Digging a Hole"
 "Lemon & Lime"
 "Unwanted Friend"
 "Bienvenido"
 "Lay Low"
 "My Autumn's Done Come"

Singles
 "I'm Sick" (May 19, 2008)
 "Lay Low" (download-only) (August 18, 2008)

References

2008 debut albums
Mark Morriss albums